The Panguipulli Batholith is a granitic batholith of Jurassic age located in the Andes around Panguipulli Lake in southern Chile.

References 

Geology of Los Ríos Region
Batholiths of South America
Lithodemic units of Chile
Jurassic magmatism
Mapuche language